(IGF) was a Japanese professional wrestling and mixed martial arts promotion founded by Antonio Inoki in 2007.

History
Antonio Inoki left New Japan Pro-Wrestling, a promotion he founded in 1972, to start the IGF. The first IGF show was held on June 29, 2007 at the Sumo Hall in Tokyo, Japan. The show's main event was a match between Kurt Angle and Brock Lesnar.

Shinichi Suzukawa was scheduled to face Bob Sapp in an IGF special rules Heavyweight bout on December 31, 2010, at K-1 Dynamite!! 2010. The fight was to be held under MMA rules, but the fighters wouldn't be wearing gloves. Closed-fist strikes would have been allowed, but palm strikes wouldn't have been permitted.  The event was to air on HDNet in North America.  However, the fight was canceled due to a last-minute contract dispute, with the Japanese audience in attendance told by the promoter involved in the dispute that Sapp “had lost his will to fight.”
In 2011 the company presented a gift to Kim Jong Il, leader of North Korea as part of a diplomatic effort. In August 2014, IGF held two shows in Pyongyang, North Korea.

On December 29, 2014, IGF announced a deal with PPTV to bring its programming to Chinese audiences.

In 2017, Inoki created a new company, ISM, distancing himself from IGF. After that, his son-in-law Simon Inoki gained more influence in the company and created a new brand, "NEW". On March 23, 2018, Antonio Inoki sold his part of the promotion and left IGF. IGF closed on January 9, 2019. A new promotion featuring IGF's Chinese wrestlers, called "Eastern Heroes", was founded in 2019 by Simon Inoki.

Roster

Roster at time of closing
Atsushi Sawada
Black Tiger V
Crusher Kawaguchi
Daichi Hashimoto
Erik Hammer
Kazuyuki Fujita
Keisuke Okuda
Kendo Kashin
Kevin Kross
Knux
Mason Williams
Minowaman
Mitsuyoshi Nakai
Montanha Silva
Naoya Ogawa
Shinichi Suzukawa
Shinya Aoki
Shogun Okamoto
Vito Rea

Notable alumni
Alexander Kozlov
Bobby Lashley
Brock Lesnar 
Daijiro Matsui
Erik Paulson 
Harry Smith
Hideki Suzuki
Hikaru Sato
Jerome Le Banner
Kurt Angle
Mirko Cro Cop
Peter Aerts
Shodai Tiger Mask
Raj Singh
Tatsumi Fujinami
Wang Bin
Yoshiaki Fujiwara
Yuichiro "Jienotsu" Nagashima
Guests
Abdullah the Butcher
The Destroyer
Dory Funk, Jr.
Stan Hansen
Tiger Jeet Singh
Supervisor
Billy Robinson

Championships

IWGP Heavyweight Championship

IGF Championship

In February 2011, IGF started a tournament to determine the first ever IGF Champion, which eventually led to a final match between Jérôme Le Banner and Josh Barnett. However, just days prior to the final match taking place, IGF announced on August 19 that Barnett would not be able to attend the event. On August 22, IGF declared Le Banner the first champion. The title was founded as a professional wrestling championship, but has since December 31, 2013, been contested in legitimate mixed martial arts fights.

Title history

Tournaments

IGF Championship Tournament

Erik Hammer replaced Shinichi Suzukawa in the tournament after defeating Ray Sefo.

World Bantamweight Grand Prix

Inoki Genome Tournament 2012

Inoki Genome Tournament 2013

IGF World GP 

Quarterfinals took place on April 11, 2015 at IGF 3
Semi-finals took place on August 29, 2015 at IGF 4
The Final took place on December 31, 2015 at Inoki Bom-Ba-Ye 2015.

IGF events

See also

Professional wrestling in Japan
List of professional wrestling promotions in Japan
List of National Wrestling Alliance territories

References

External links

Japanese professional wrestling promotions
2007 establishments in Japan
Japanese companies established in 2007
Entertainment companies established in 2007
Japanese companies disestablished in 2019
Entertainment companies disestablished in 2019
Companies based in Tokyo
National Wrestling Alliance members